Saifai railway station, also spelled as Saiphai railway station is a small railway station in Saifai (Etawah district), Uttar Pradesh. Its code is SIPI. It serves Saifai village. The station consists of only one platform. The platform is not well sheltered. It lacks many facilities including water and sanitation. It is located on newly built Mainpuri-Etawah railway track.

In 2004, then President of India Dr. A. P. J. Abdul Kalam laid the foundation stone of this railway track in Saifai.

References 

Transport in Saifai
Allahabad railway division
Railway stations in Etawah district
Saifai